The 1999 NCAA Division II Lacrosse Championship was the 15th annual tournament to determine the national champions of NCAA Division II men's college lacrosse in the United States.

The final, and only match of the tournament, was played at Ludwig Field at the University of Maryland in College Park, Maryland. 

Defending champions Adelphi defeated C.W. Post in the championship game, 11–8, to claim the Panthers' sixth Division II national title.

Bracket

See also
1999 NCAA Division I Men's Lacrosse Championship
1999 NCAA Division I Women's Lacrosse Championship
1999 NCAA Division III Men's Lacrosse Championship

References

NCAA Division II Men's Lacrosse Championship
NCAA Division II Men's Lacrosse Championship
NCAA Division II Men's Lacrosse